The Indonesian Unity Party  was a political party in Indonesia.

It had its origins in an August 2002 meeting of 15 political parties that had failed to reach the electoral threshold in the 1999 legislative election to qualify for the subsequent election. The idea was that the parties would band together to establish a new party. However, this proved impossible because of differences such as religion and ideologies. Three parties soon dropped out, then another two but driven by the desire to take part in the next election, the remaining ten formed an alliance. By the time the Bogor Political Memorandum was signed on 24 November 2002 only eight parties remained. The following month, the new party was founded.

In the 2004 legislative election, the Indonesian Unity Party won 0.6% of the popular vote and no seats. After initially failing to qualify, following a lawsuit, the party won the right to contest the 2009 elections, in which it won only 0.14 percent of the vote and no seats. In April 2005, the party officially merged into the National Mandate Party (PAN).

References

Pancasila political parties
Political parties in Indonesia